Andrew Morris (born 18 March 1982) is an English retired professional footballer who played as a midfielder for Wigan Athletic in the Football League.

He made his debut on 7 December 1999, in the 2–1 win over Burnley in the Football League Trophy Northern Section 1st Round, coming on as a substitute in the 87th minute for Brian McLaughlin. He scored the Golden goal in the 105th minute to win the tie.

Club stats

References

1982 births
Living people
Footballers from Wigan
English footballers
Association football midfielders
Wigan Athletic F.C. players
Runcorn F.C. Halton players